Tantsud tähtedega 2008 was the third season of the Estonian version of Dancing with the Stars, and was broadcast on the Estonian television channel Kanal 2. The hosts were Mart Sander and Gerli Padar, the runner up of the first season. The jury members were Merle Klandord, Ants Teal, Märt Agu and Riina Suhhotskaja.

Couples

Judges’ scoring summary
Bold scores indicate the highest for that week. Red indicates the lowest score.  

The Best Score (40)

Highest and lowest scoring performances 
The best and worst performances in each dance according to the judges' marks are as follows:

Season 2008
2000s Estonian television series
2008 Estonian television seasons
Estonian reality television series